The Lawrence Township Historic District is a  historic district encompassing the community of Lawrenceville in Lawrence Township, Mercer County, New Jersey, United States. It was added to the National Register of Historic Places on September 14, 1972 for its significance in architecture, landscape architecture, literature, military history, and transportation. The district includes 45 contributing buildings.

Description
The district includes a number of buildings along US Route 206 (formerly King's Highway, as well as the Lincoln Highway), two early cemeteries associated with the Presbyterian Church of Lawrenceville (Est. 1697), and the Lawrenceville School. Prominent architects represented in the district include Peabody and Stearns, William Adams Delano, and Frederick Law Olmsted.

See also
National Register of Historic Places listings in Mercer County, New Jersey

References

Further reading

External links

Lawrence Township, Mercer County, New Jersey
National Register of Historic Places in Mercer County, New Jersey
Historic districts on the National Register of Historic Places in New Jersey
New Jersey Register of Historic Places